Binaghia is a genus of beetles in the family Mordellidae, containing the following species:

 Binaghia concii Franciscolo, 1943
 Binaghia humerosticta Franciscolo, 1943

References

Mordellinae
Mordellidae genera